The United Socialist Workers' Party (Partido Socialista de los Trabajadores Unificado, PSTU) is the Argentine section of the International Workers' League (Fourth International) (LIT), a Trotskyist-Morenoist grouping.

It was formed in 2011 by the fusion of the FOS and the COI, two groups associated with the LIT.

It is backing the Workers' Left Front.

References

report on formation
Communist parties in Argentina
International Workers League – Fourth International
Trotskyist organisations in Argentina